The art of Europe, or Western art, encompasses the history of visual art in Europe. European prehistoric art started as mobile Upper Paleolithic rock and cave painting and petroglyph art and was characteristic of the period between the Paleolithic and the Iron Age.  Written histories of European art often begin with the Aegean civilizations, dating from the 3rd millennium BC. However a consistent pattern of artistic development within Europe becomes clear only with Ancient Greek art, which was adopted and transformed by Rome and carried; with the Roman Empire, across much of Europe, North Africa and Western Asia.

The influence of the art of the Classical period waxed and waned throughout the next two thousand years, seeming to slip into a distant memory in parts of the Medieval period, to re-emerge in the Renaissance, suffer a period of what some early art historians viewed as "decay" during the Baroque period, to reappear in a refined form in Neo-Classicism and to be reborn in Post-Modernism.

Before the 1800s, the Christian church was a major influence upon European art, and commissions from the Church provided the major source of work for artists. In the same period there was also a renewed interest in classical mythology, great wars, heroes and heroines, and themese not connected to religion. Most art of the last 200 years has been produced without reference to religion and often with no particular ideology at all, but art has often been influenced by political issues, whether reflecting the concerns of patrons or the artist.

European art is arranged into a number of stylistic periods, which, historically, overlap each other as different styles flourished in different areas. Broadly the periods are, Classical, Byzantine, Medieval, Gothic, Renaissance, Baroque, Rococo, Neoclassical, Modern, Postmodern and New European Painting.

Prehistoric art

European prehistoric art is an important part of the European cultural heritage.  Prehistoric art history is usually divided into four main periods: Stone Age, Neolithic, Bronze Age, and Iron Age. Most of the remaining artifacts of this period are small sculptures and cave paintings.

Much surviving prehistoric art is small portable sculptures, with a small group of female Venus figurines such as the Venus of Willendorf (24,000–22,000 BC) found across central Europe; the 30 cm tall Löwenmensch figurine of about 30,000 BCE has hardly any pieces that can be related to it.  The Swimming Reindeer of about 11,000 BCE is one of the finest of a number of Magdalenian carvings in bone or antler of animals in the art of the Upper Paleolithic, though they are outnumbered by engraved pieces, which are sometimes classified as sculpture. With the beginning of the Mesolithic in Europe figurative sculpture greatly reduced, and remained a less common element in art than relief decoration of practical objects until the Roman period, despite some works such as the Gundestrup cauldron from the European Iron Age and the Bronze Age Trundholm sun chariot.

The oldest European cave art dates back 40,800, and can be found in the El Castillo Cave in Spain.  Other cave painting sites include Lascaux, Cave of Altamira, Grotte de Cussac, Pech Merle, Cave of Niaux, Chauvet Cave, Font-de-Gaume, Creswell Crags, Nottinghamshire, England, (Cave etchings and bas-reliefs discovered in 2003), Coliboaia cave from Romania (considered the oldest cave painting in central Europe) and Magura, Belogradchik, Bulgaria.  Rock painting was also performed on cliff faces, but fewer of those have survived because of erosion.  One well-known example is the rock paintings of Astuvansalmi in the Saimaa area of Finland. When Marcelino Sanz de Sautuola first encountered the Magdalenian paintings of the Altamira cave, Cantabria, Spain in 1879, the academics of the time considered them hoaxes.  Recent reappraisals and numerous additional discoveries have since demonstrated their authenticity, while at the same time stimulating interest in the artistry of Upper Palaeolithic peoples.  Cave paintings, undertaken with only the most rudimentary tools, can also furnish valuable insight into the culture and beliefs of that era.

The Rock art of the Iberian Mediterranean Basin represents a very different style, with the human figure the main focus, often seen in large groups, with battles, dancing and hunting all represented, as well as other activities and details such as clothing.  The figures are generally rather sketchily depicted in thin paint, with the relationships between the groups of humans and animals more carefully depicted than individual figures. Other less numerous groups of rock art, many engraved rather than painted, show similar characteristics. The Iberian examples are believed to date from a long period perhaps covering the Upper Paleolithic, Mesolithic and early Neolithic.

Prehistoric Celtic art comes from much of Iron Age Europe and survives mainly in the form of high-status metalwork skillfully decorated with complex, elegant and mostly abstract designs, often using curving and spiral forms. There are human heads and some fully represented animals, but full-length human figures at any size are so rare that their absence may represent a religious taboo.  As the Romans conquered Celtic territories, it almost entirely vanishes, but the style continued in limited use in the British Isles, and with the coming of Christianity revived there in the Insular style of the Early Middle Ages.

Ancient

Minoan

The Minoan civilization of Crete is regarded as the oldest civilization in Europe. Minoan art is marked by imaginative images and exceptional workmanship.  Sinclair Hood described an "essential quality of the finest Minoan art, the ability to create an atmosphere of movement and life although following a set of highly formal conventions".  It forms part of the wider grouping of Aegean art, and in later periods came for a time to have a dominant influence over Cycladic art.  Wood and textiles have decomposed, so most surviving examples of Minoan art are pottery, intricately-carved Minoan seals, .palace frescos which include landscapes), small sculptures in various materials, jewellery, and metalwork. 

The relationship of Minoan art to that of other contemporary cultures and later Ancient Greek art has been much discussed. It clearly dominated Mycenaean art and Cycladic art of the same periods, even after Crete was occupied by the Mycenaeans, but only some aspects of the tradition survived the Greek Dark Ages after the collapse of  Mycenaean Greece.

Minoan art has a variety of subject-matter, much of it appearing across different media, although only some styles of pottery include figurative scenes.  Bull-leaping appears in painting and several types of sculpture, and is thought to have had a religious significance; bull's heads are also a popular subject in terracotta and other sculptural materials.  There are no figures that appear to be portraits of individuals, or are clearly royal, and the identities of religious figures is often tentative, with scholars uncertain whether they are deities, clergy or devotees.  Equally, whether painted rooms were "shrines" or secular is far from clear; one room in Akrotiri has been argued to be a bedroom, with remains of a bed, or a shrine.

Animals, including an unusual variety of marine fauna, are often depicted; the "Marine Style" is a type of painted palace pottery from MM III and LM IA that paints sea creatures including octopus spreading all over the vessel, and probably originated from similar frescoed scenes; sometimes these appear in other media.  Scenes of hunting and warfare, and horses and riders, are mostly found in later periods, in works perhaps made by Cretans for a Mycenaean market, or Mycenaean overlords of Crete.

While Minoan figures, whether human or animal, have a great sense of life and movement, they are often not very accurate, and the species is sometimes impossible to identify; by comparison with Ancient Egyptian art they are often more vivid, but less naturalistic.  In comparison with the art of other ancient cultures there is a high proportion of female figures, though the idea that Minoans had only goddesses and no gods is now discounted.  Most human figures are in profile or in a version of the Egyptian convention with the head and legs in profile, and the torso seen frontally; but the Minoan figures exaggerate features such as slim male waists and large female breasts.

Classical Greek and Hellenistic 

Ancient Greece had great painters, great sculptors, and great architects. The Parthenon is an example of their architecture that has lasted to modern days. Greek marble sculpture is often described as the highest form of Classical art.  Painting on the pottery of Ancient Greece and ceramics gives a particularly informative glimpse into the way society in Ancient Greece functioned. Black-figure vase painting and Red-figure vase painting gives many surviving examples of what Greek painting was. Some famous Greek painters on wooden panels who are mentioned in texts are Apelles, Zeuxis and Parrhasius, however no examples of Ancient Greek panel painting survive, only written descriptions by their contemporaries or by later Romans.  Zeuxis lived in 5–6 BC and was said to be the first to use sfumato. According to Pliny the Elder, the realism of his paintings was such that birds tried to eat the painted grapes.  Apelles is described as the greatest painter of Antiquity for perfect technique in drawing, brilliant color and modeling.

Roman 

Roman art was influenced by Greece and can in part be taken as a descendant of ancient Greek painting and sculpture, but was also strongly influenced by the more local Etruscan art of Italy. Roman sculpture, is primarily portraiture derived from the upper classes of society as well as depictions of the gods. However, Roman painting does have important unique characteristics.  Among surviving Roman paintings are wall paintings, many from villas in Campania, in Southern Italy, especially at Pompeii and Herculaneum. Such painting can be grouped into four main "styles" or periods and may contain the first examples of trompe-l'œil, pseudo-perspective, and pure landscape.

Almost all of the surviving painted portraits from the Ancient world are a large number of coffin-portraits of bust form found in the Late Antique cemetery of Al-Fayum.  They give an idea of the quality that the finest ancient work must have had.  A very small number of miniatures from Late Antique illustrated books also survive, and a rather larger number of copies of them from the Early Medieval period. Early Christian art grew out of Roman popular, and later Imperial, art and adapted its iconography from these sources.

Medieval

Most surviving art from the Medieval period was religious in focus, often funded by the Church, powerful ecclesiastical individuals such as bishops, communal groups such as abbeys, or wealthy secular patrons. Many had specific liturgical functions—processional crosses and altarpieces, for example.

One of the central questions about Medieval art concerns its lack of realism. A great deal of knowledge of perspective in art and understanding of the human figure was lost with the fall of Rome. But realism was not the primary concern of Medieval artists. They were simply trying to send a religious message, a task which demands clear iconic images instead of precisely rendered ones.

Time Period: 6th century to 15th century

Early Medieval art
Migration period art is a general term for the art of the "barbarian" peoples who moved into formerly Roman territories. Celtic art in the 7th and 8th centuries saw a fusion with Germanic traditions through contact with the Anglo-Saxons creating what is called the Hiberno-Saxon style or Insular art, which was to be highly influential on the rest of the Middle Ages. Merovingian art describes the art of the Franks before about 800, when Carolingian art combined insular influences with a self-conscious classical revival, developing into Ottonian art. Anglo-Saxon art is the art of England after the Insular period. Illuminated manuscripts contain nearly all the surviving painting of the period, but architecture, metalwork and small carved work in wood or ivory were also important media.

Byzantine

Byzantine art overlaps with or merges with what we call Early Christian art until the iconoclasm period of 730-843 when the vast majority of artwork with figures was destroyed; so little remains that today any discovery sheds new understanding. After 843 until 1453 there is a clear Byzantine art tradition. It is often the finest art of the Middle Ages in terms of quality of material and workmanship, with production centered on Constantinople. Byzantine art's crowning achievement were the monumental frescos and mosaics inside domed churches, most of which have not survived due to natural disasters and the appropriation of churches to mosques.

Romanesque

Romanesque art refers to the period from about 1000 to the rise of Gothic art in the 12th century.  This was a period of increasing prosperity, and the first to see a coherent style used across Europe, from Scandinavia to Sicily.  Romanesque art is vigorous and direct, was originally brightly coloured, and is often very sophisticated. Stained glass and enamel on metalwork became important media, and larger sculptures in the round developed, although high relief was the principal technique.  Its architecture is dominated by thick walls, and round-headed windows and arches, with much carved decoration.

Gothic

Gothic art is a variable term depending on the craft, place and time. The term originated with Gothic architecture in 1140, but Gothic painting did not appear until around 1200 (this date has many qualifications), when it diverged from Romanesque style. Gothic sculpture was born in France in 1144 with the renovation of the Abbey Church of S. Denis and spread throughout Europe, by the 13th century it had become the international style, replacing Romanesque. International Gothic describes Gothic art from about 1360 to 1430, after which Gothic art merges into Renaissance art at different times in different places. During this period forms such as painting, in fresco and on panel, become newly important, and the end of the period includes new media such as prints.

Renaissance

The Renaissance is characterized by a focus on the arts of Ancient Greece and Rome, which led to many changes in both the technical aspects of painting and sculpture, as well as to their subject matter. It began in Italy, a country rich in Roman heritage as well as material prosperity to fund artists. During the Renaissance, painters began to enhance the realism of their work by using new techniques in perspective, thus representing three dimensions more authentically. Artists also began to use new techniques in the manipulation of light and darkness, such as the tone contrast evident in many of Titian's portraits and the development of sfumato and chiaroscuro by Leonardo da Vinci. Sculptors, too, began to rediscover many ancient techniques such as contrapposto. Following with the humanist spirit of the age, art became more secular in subject matter, depicting ancient mythology in addition to Christian themes. This genre of art is often referred to as Renaissance Classicism. In the North, the most important Renaissance innovation was the widespread use of oil paints, which allowed for greater colour and intensity.

From Gothic to the Renaissance
During the late 13th century and early 14th century, much of the painting in Italy was Byzantine in character, notably that of Duccio of Siena and Cimabue of Florence, while Pietro Cavallini in Rome was more Gothic in style. During the 13th century, Italian sculptors began to draw inspiration not only from medieval prototypes, but also from ancient works.

In 1290, Giotto began painting in a manner that was less traditional and more based upon observation of nature. His famous cycle at the Scrovegni Chapel, Padua, is seen as the beginnings of a Renaissance style.

Other painters of the 14th century were carried the Gothic style to great elaboration and detail. Notable among these painters are Simone Martini and Gentile da Fabriano.

In the Netherlands, the technique of painting in oils rather than tempera, led itself to a form of elaboration that was not dependent upon the application of gold leaf and embossing, but upon the minute depiction of the natural world. The art of painting textures with great realism evolved at this time. Dutch painters such as Jan van Eyck and Hugo van der Goes were to have great influence on Late Gothic and Early Renaissance painting.

Early Renaissance
The ideas of the Renaissance first emerged in the city-state of Florence, Italy. The sculptor Donatello returned to classical techniques such as contrapposto and classical subjects like the unsupported nude—his second sculpture of David was the first free-standing bronze nude created in Europe since the Roman Empire. The sculptor and architect Brunelleschi studied the architectural ideas of ancient Roman buildings for inspiration. Masaccio perfected elements like composition, individual expression, and human form to paint frescoes, especially those in the Brancacci Chapel, of surprising elegance, drama, and emotion.

A remarkable number of these major artists worked on different portions of the Florence Cathedral. Brunelleschi's dome for the cathedral was one of the first truly revolutionary architectural innovations since the Gothic flying buttress. Donatello created many of its sculptures. Giotto and Lorenzo Ghiberti also contributed to the cathedral.

High Renaissance
High Renaissance artists include such figures as Leonardo da Vinci, Michelangelo Buonarroti, and Raffaello Sanzio.

The 15th-century artistic developments in Italy (for example, the interest in perspectival systems, in depicting anatomy, and in classical cultures) matured during the 16th century, accounting for the designations "Early Renaissance" for the 15th century and "High Renaissance" for the 16th century. Although no singular style characterizes the High Renaissance, the art of those most closely associated with this period—Leonardo da Vinci, Raphael, Michelangelo, and Titian—exhibits an astounding mastery, both technical and aesthetic. High Renaissance artists created works of such authority that generations of later artists relied on these artworks for instruction.
These exemplary artistic creations further elevated the prestige of artists. Artists could claim divine inspiration, thereby raising visual art to a status formerly given only to poetry. Thus, painters, sculptors, and architects came into their own, successfully claiming for their work a high position among the fine arts. In a sense, 16th- century masters created a new profession with its own rights of expression and its own venerable character.

Northern art up to the Renaissance
Early Netherlandish painting developed (but did not strictly invent) the technique of oil painting to allow greater control in painting minute detail with realism—Jan van Eyck (1366–1441) was a figure in the movement from illuminated manuscripts to panel paintings.

Hieronymus Bosch (1450?–1516), a Dutch painter, is another important figure in the Northern Renaissance. In his paintings, he used religious themes, but combined them with grotesque fantasies, colorful imagery, and peasant folk legends. His paintings often reflect the confusion and anguish associated with the end of the Middle Ages.

Albrecht Dürer introduced Italian Renaissance style to Germany at the end of the 15th century, and dominated German Renaissance art.

Time Period:
 Italian Renaissance: Late 14th century to Early 16th century
 Northern Renaissance: 16th century

Mannerism, Baroque, and Rococo

In European art, Renaissance Classicism spawned two different movements—Mannerism and the Baroque. Mannerism, a reaction against the idealist perfection of Classicism, employed distortion of light and spatial frameworks in order to emphasize the emotional content of a painting and the emotions of the painter. The work of El Greco is a particularly clear example of Mannerism in painting during the late 16th, early 17th centuries. Northern Mannerism took longer to develop, and was largely a movement of the last half of the 16th century. Baroque art took the representationalism of the Renaissance to new heights, emphasizing detail, movement, lighting, and drama in their search for beauty. Perhaps the best known Baroque painters are Caravaggio, Rembrandt, Peter Paul Rubens, and Diego Velázquez.

A rather different art developed out of northern realist traditions in 17th-century Dutch Golden Age painting, which had very little religious art, and little history painting, instead playing a crucial part in developing secular genres such as still life, genre paintings of everyday scenes, and landscape painting.  While the Baroque nature of Rembrandt's art is clear, the label is less use for Vermeer and many other Dutch artists. Flemish Baroque painting shared a part in this trend, while also continuing to produce the traditional categories.

Baroque art is often seen as part of the Counter-Reformation—the artistic element of the revival of spiritual life in the Roman Catholic Church. Additionally, the emphasis that Baroque art placed on grandeur is seen as Absolutist in nature. Religious and political themes were widely explored within the Baroque artistic context, and both paintings and sculptures were characterised by a strong element of drama, emotion and theatricality. Famous Baroque artists include Caravaggio or Rubens. Artemisia Gentileschi was another noteworthy artist, who was inspired by Caravaggio's style. Baroque art was particularly ornate and elaborate in nature, often using rich, warm colours with dark undertones. Pomp and grandeur were important elements of the Baroque artistic movement in general, as can be seen when Louis XIV said, "I am grandeur incarnate"; many Baroque artists served kings who tried to realize this goal. Baroque art in many ways was similar to Renaissance art; as a matter of fact, the term was initially used in a derogative manner to describe post-Renaissance art and architecture which was over-elaborate. Baroque art can be seen as a more elaborate and dramatic re-adaptation of late Renaissance art.

By the 18th century, however, Baroque art was falling out of fashion as many deemed it too melodramatic and also gloomy, and it developed into the Rococo, which emerged in France. Rococo art was even more elaborate than the Baroque, but it was less serious and more playful. Whilst the Baroque used rich, strong colours, Rococo used pale, creamier shades. The artistic movement no longer placed an emphasis on politics and religion, focusing instead on lighter themes such as romance, celebration, and appreciation of nature. Rococo art also contrasted the Baroque as it often refused symmetry in favor of asymmetrical designs. Furthermore, it sought inspiration from the artistic forms and ornamentation of Far Eastern Asia, resulting in the rise in favour of porcelain figurines and chinoiserie in general. The 18th-century style flourished for a short while; nevertheless, the Rococo style soon fell out of favor, being seen by many as a gaudy and superficial movement emphasizing aesthetics over meaning. Neoclassicism in many ways developed as a counter movement of the Rococo, the impetus being a sense of disgust directed towards the latter's florid qualities.

Mannerism (16th century)

Baroque (early 17th century to mid-early 18th century)

Rococo (early to mid-18th century)

Neoclassicism, Romanticism, Academism, and Realism

Throughout the 18th century, a counter movement opposing the Rococo sprang up in different parts of Europe, commonly known as Neoclassicism. It despised the perceived superficiality and frivolity of Rococo art, and desired for a return to the simplicity, order and 'purism' of classical antiquity, especially ancient Greece and Rome. The movement was in part also influenced by the Renaissance, which itself was strongly influenced by classical art. Neoclassicism was the artistic component of the intellectual movement known as the Enlightenment; the Enlightenment was idealistic, and put its emphasis on objectivity, reason and empirical truth. Neoclassicism had become widespread in Europe throughout the 18th century, especially in the United Kingdom, which saw great works of Neoclassical architecture spring up during this period; Neoclassicism's fascination with classical antiquity can be seen in the popularity of the Grand Tour during this decade, where wealthy aristocrats travelled to the ancient ruins of Italy and Greece. Nevertheless, a defining moment for Neoclassicism came during the French Revolution in the late 18th century; in France, Rococo art was replaced with the preferred Neoclassical art, which was seen as more serious than the former movement. In many ways, Neoclassicism can be seen as a political movement as well as an artistic and cultural one. Neoclassical art places an emphasis on order, symmetry and classical simplicity; common themes in Neoclassical art include courage and war, as were commonly explored in ancient Greek and Roman art. Ingres, Canova, and Jacques-Louis David are among the best-known neoclassicists.
 

Just as Mannerism rejected Classicism, so did Romanticism reject the ideas of the Enlightenment and the aesthetic of the Neoclassicists. Romanticism rejected the highly objective and ordered nature of Neoclassicism, and opted for a more individual and emotional approach to the arts. Romanticism placed an emphasis on nature, especially when aiming to portray the power and beauty of the natural world, and emotions, and sought a highly personal approach to art. Romantic art was about individual feelings, not common themes, such as in Neoclassicism; in such a way, Romantic art often used colours in order to express feelings and emotion. Similarly to Neoclassicism, Romantic art took much of its inspiration from ancient Greek and Roman art and mythology, yet, unlike Neoclassical, this inspiration was primarily used as a way to create symbolism and imagery. Romantic art also takes much of its aesthetic qualities from medievalism and Gothicism, as well as mythology and folklore. Among the greatest Romantic artists were Eugène Delacroix, Francisco Goya, J.M.W. Turner, John Constable, Caspar David Friedrich, Thomas Cole, and William Blake.

Most artists attempted to take a centrist approach which adopted different features of Neoclassicist and Romanticist styles, in order to synthesize them. The different attempts took place within the French Academy, and collectively are called Academic art. Adolphe William Bouguereau is considered a chief example of this stream of art.

In the early 19th century the face of Europe, however, became radically altered by industrialization. Poverty, squalor, and desperation were to be the fate of the new working class created by the "revolution". In response to these changes going on in society, the movement of Realism emerged. Realism sought to accurately portray the conditions and hardships of the poor in the hopes of changing society. In contrast with Romanticism, which was essentially optimistic about mankind, Realism offered a stark vision of poverty and despair. Similarly, while Romanticism glorified nature, Realism portrayed life in the depths of an urban wasteland. Like Romanticism, Realism was a literary as well as an artistic movement. The great Realist painters include Jean-Baptiste-Siméon Chardin, Gustave Courbet, Jean-François Millet, Camille Corot, Honoré Daumier, Édouard Manet, Edgar Degas (both considered as Impressionists), and Thomas Eakins, among others.

The response of architecture to industrialisation, in stark contrast to the other arts, was to veer towards historicism. Although the railway stations built during this period are often considered the truest reflections of its spirit – they are sometimes called "the cathedrals of the age" – the main movements in architecture during the Industrial Age were revivals of styles from the distant past, such as the Gothic Revival. Related movements were the Pre-Raphaelite Brotherhood, who attempted to return art to its state of "purity" prior to Raphael, and the Arts and Crafts Movement, which reacted against the impersonality of mass-produced goods and advocated a return to medieval craftsmanship.

Time Period:
Neoclassicism: mid-early 18th century to early 19th century
Romanticism: late 18th century to mid-19th century
Realism: 19th century

Modern art

Out of the naturalist ethic of Realism grew a major artistic movement, Impressionism. The Impressionists pioneered the use of light in painting as they attempted to capture light as seen from the human eye. Edgar Degas,
Édouard Manet, Claude Monet, Camille Pissarro, and Pierre-Auguste Renoir, were all involved in the Impressionist movement. As a direct outgrowth of Impressionism came the development of Post-Impressionism. Paul Cézanne, Vincent van Gogh, Paul Gauguin, Georges Seurat are the best known Post-Impressionists.

Following the Impressionists and the Post-Impressionists came Fauvism, often considered the first "modern" genre of art. Just as the Impressionists revolutionized light, so did the fauvists rethink color, painting their canvases in bright, wild hues. After the Fauvists, modern art began to develop in all its forms, ranging from Expressionism, concerned with evoking emotion through objective works of art, to Cubism, the art of transposing a four-dimensional reality onto a flat canvas, to Abstract art. These new art forms pushed the limits of traditional notions of "art" and corresponded to the similar rapid changes that were taking place in human society, technology, and thought.

Surrealism is often classified as a form of Modern Art. However, the Surrealists themselves have objected to the study of surrealism as an era in art history, claiming that it oversimplifies the complexity of the movement (which they say is not an artistic movement), misrepresents the relationship of surrealism to aesthetics, and falsely characterizes ongoing surrealism as a finished, historically encapsulated era. Other forms of Modern art (some of which border on Contemporary art) include:

 Abstract expressionism
 Art Deco
 Art Nouveau
 Bauhaus
 Color Field painting
 Conceptual Art
 Constructivism
 Cubism
 Dada
 Der Blaue Reiter
 De Stijl
 Die Brücke
 Body Art
 Expressionism
 Fauvism
 Fluxus
 Futurism
 Happening
 Surrealism
 Lettrisme
 Lyrical Abstraction
 Land Art
 Minimalism
 Naive art
 Op art
 Performance art
 Photorealism
 Pop art
 Suprematism
 Video art
 Vorticism

Time Period: 
 Impressionism: late 19th Century
 Others: First half of the 20th century

Contemporary art and Postmodern art

Modern art foreshadowed several characteristics of what would later be defined as postmodern art; as a matter of fact, several modern art movements can often be classified as both modern and postmodern, such as pop art. Postmodern art, for instance, places a strong emphasis on irony, parody and humour in general; modern art started to develop a more ironic approach to art which would later advance in a postmodern context. Postmodern art sees the blurring between the high and fine arts with low-end and commercial art; modern art started to experiment with this blurring.
Recent developments in art have been characterised by a significant expansion of what can now deemed to be art, in terms of materials, media, activity and concept. Conceptual art in particular has had a wide influence. This started literally as the replacement of concept for a made object, one of the intentions of which was to refute the commodification of art. However, it now usually refers to an artwork where there is an object, but the main claim for the work is made for the thought process that has informed it. The aspect of commercialism has returned to the work.

There has also been an increase in art referring to previous movements and artists, and gaining validity from that reference.

Postmodernism in art, which has grown since the 1960s, differs from Modernism in as much as Modern art movements were primarily focused on their own activities and values, while Postmodernism uses the whole range of previous movements as a reference point. This has by definition generated a relativistic outlook, accompanied by irony and a certain disbelief in values, as each can be seen to be replaced by another. Another result of this has been the growth of commercialism and celebrity. Postmodern art has questioned common rules and guidelines of what is regarded as 'fine art', merging low art with the fine arts until none is fully distinguishable. Before the advent of postmodernism, the fine arts were characterised by a form of aesthetic quality, elegance, craftsmanship, finesse and intellectual stimulation which was intended to appeal to the upper or educated classes; this distinguished high art from low art, which, in turn, was seen as tacky, kitsch, easily made and lacking in much or any intellectual stimulation, art which was intended to appeal to the masses. Postmodern art blurred these distinctions, bringing a strong element of kitsch, commercialism and campness into contemporary fine art; what is nowadays seen as fine art may have been seen as low art before postmodernism revolutionised the concept of what high or fine art truly is. In addition, the postmodern nature of contemporary art leaves a lot of space for individualism within the art scene; for instance, postmodern art often takes inspiration from past artistic movements, such as Gothic or Baroque art, and both juxtaposes and recycles styles from these past periods in a different context.

Some surrealists in particular Joan Miró, who called for the "murder of painting" (In numerous interviews dating from the 1930s onwards, Miró expressed contempt for conventional painting methods and his desire to "kill", "murder", or "rape" them in favor of more contemporary means of expression).  have denounced or attempted to "supersede" painting, and there have also been other anti-painting trends among artistic movements, such as that of Dada and conceptual art. The trend away from painting in the late 20th century has been countered by various movements, for example the continuation of Minimal Art, Lyrical Abstraction, Pop Art, Op Art, New Realism, Photorealism, Neo Geo, Neo-expressionism, New European Painting, Stuckism, Excessivism and various other important and influential painterly directions.

See also
History of art
History of painting
 Lives of the Most Excellent Painters, Sculptors, and Architects (16th century book)
 Modernism
 Painting in the Americas before European colonization
 Western European paintings in Ukrainian museums
List of time periods

References

Bibliography
Chapin, Anne P., "Power, Privilege and Landscape in Minoan Art", in Charis: Essays in Honor of Sara A. Immerwahr, Hesperia (Princeton, N.J.) 33, 2004, ASCSA, 9780876615331, google books
Gates, Charles, "Pictorial Imagery in Minoan Wall Painting", in Charis: Essays in Honor of Sara A. Immerwahr, Hesperia (Princeton, N.J.) 33, 2004, ASCSA, 9780876615331, google books
Hood, Sinclair, The Arts in Prehistoric Greece, 1978, Penguin (Penguin/Yale History of Art), 
 Sandars, Nancy K., Prehistoric Art in Europe, Penguin (Pelican, now Yale, History of Art), 1968 (nb 1st edn.; early datings now superseded)

External links

 Web Gallery of Art
 Postmodernism
 European artists community 
 Panopticon Virtual Art Gallery

 
Europe
Western culture